Alt det jeg ville have sagt is the debut studio album by Danish pop singer and songwriter Basim. It was released in Denmark on 6 October 2008. The album peaked at number eight on the Danish Albums Chart. The album includes the singles "Alt det jeg ville have sagt", "Jeg vil" and "Baby, jeg savner dig".

Singles
 "Alt det jeg ville have sagt" was released as the lead single from the album on 11 August 2008. The song peaked at number 34 on the Danish Singles Chart.
 "Jeg vil" was released as the second single from the album in October 2008. The song peaked number 26 on the Danish Singles Chart.
 "Baby, jeg savner dig" was released as the third single from the album on 26 March 2009.

Track listing

Chart performance

Weekly charts

Release history

References

2008 debut albums
Basim (singer) albums